Franklin and Friends is a CGI children's television series produced by Nelvana. The second adaptation and spin-off of the classic characters from the Franklin the Turtle series of children's books written by Paulette Bourgeois and illustrated by Brenda Clark (the first being Franklin, which was also produced by Nelvana), the series was announced by Nelvana on September 28, 2010. The series premiered on Treehouse TV on March 4, 2011. The series’ theme song is a revamped version of the original series theme, "Hey It's Franklin".

The series ended on December 22, 2013. 52 episodes were produced.
But Reruns On Univision Planeta U On June 18 2022

Overview
Aside from Franklin, (voiced by Graeme Jokic) other characters from the original series return, including Bear, Fox, Rabbit, Beaver, Goose and Snail, as well as his baby sister Harriet. Raccoon and Badger appear to be gone until 2013. Aunt T, a new character, is introduced in this series; she has a youthful personality. Another new character is Officer Rabbit; a grey female rabbit police officer. The series features special themes which include mysteries, Woodland events, and outdoor activities.

Broadcast and release
The series debuted on Treehouse TV on March 4, 2011. It premiered in the United States on Nickelodeon on February 13, 2012, and on Nick Jr. on March 1, 2012.

The series returned to Nick Jr. on Pluto TV on May 1, 2019, to 2021.

Episodes

Season 1 (2011–2012)

Season 2 (2013)

Specials (2014)

References

External links
 
 Franklin and Friends on ABC 4 Kids
 Franklin and Friends on Discovery Kids Brazil (Games)
 Franklin and Friends on Discovery Kids Latin America
 Franklin and Friends on Nick Jr. US
 Franklin and Friends on KIKA
 Franklin and Friends on Tiny Pop (Games)
 Franklin and Friends on TFOU 
 Franklin and Friends on Treehouse
 Franklin and Friends on ZeeQ India's first Edutainment Channel  

2010s Canadian animated television series
2010s Canadian children's television series
2011 Canadian television series debuts
2013 Canadian television series endings
Canadian computer-animated television series
Canadian children's animated adventure television series
Canadian children's animated fantasy television series
Canadian preschool education television series
Canadian television shows based on children's books
Animated preschool education television series
2010s preschool education television series
Animated television series reboots
English-language television shows
Franklin the Turtle (books)
Treehouse TV original programming
Nick Jr. original programming
Animated television series about turtles
Animated television series about siblings
Animated television series about children
Television series by Nelvana
Singaporean animated television series